P'isaqa Kunka (Aymara p'isaqa Nothoprocta, kunka throat, "p'isaqa's throat", hispanicized spelling Pisaccacunca) or K'ank'awi (Aymara k'ank'a opening, gap; crevice, -wi a suffix to indicate a place, "a place of crevices", hispanicized spelling Cancahui) ) is a mountain in the Andes of Peru, about  high. It is located in the Puno Region, El Collao Province, Santa Rosa District, north of a lake named Lurisquta. P'isaqa Kunka lies southwest of Kuntur Wawachawi.

References

Mountains of Puno Region
Mountains of Peru